The  is an electric multiple unit (EMU) train type operated by the private railway operator Sagami Railway (Sotetsu) in Japan. A total of six ten-car sets were built by Japan Transport Engineering Company (J-TREC) for use on Sōtetsu Shin-Yokohama Line services.

Formation
The trains are formed as ten-car sets. The sets are formed as shown below.

Cars 3 and 9 each have one single-arm pantograph, and car 5 has two.

Interior
The interior is based on that of the 20000 series and has LED lighting which adjusts automatically according to the time of day. Spaces for wheelchairs and strollers are also provided; they also feature surveillance cameras.

Technical specifications
The 12000 series trains are built by J-TREC as part of their "Sustina S24 Series" design, and use VVVF-IGBT technology. They have stainless steel car bodies, which are painted in the "Yokohama Navy Blue" corporate livery. They also feature internal and external door buttons.

History 
In April 2018, Sotetsu announced the introduction of a new train type for Sōtetsu JR Link Line services. The first set was delivered from J-TREC in December 2018. The trains entered revenue service on 20 April 2019. All six sets are scheduled to be introduced by the end of 2019.

See also
 Sotetsu 20000 series

References

External links

  
 Sotetsu news release 

Electric multiple units of Japan
12000 series
Train-related introductions in 2019
1500 V DC multiple units of Japan
J-TREC multiple units